Manka is a community council located in the Leribe District of Lesotho. Its population in 2006 was 20,693.

Villages
The community of Manka includes the villages of Ha 'Musi, Ha Eleke (Peka), Ha Fako, Ha Foka, Ha Hlaname, Ha Keenya, Ha Kotola, Ha Leburu, Ha Leburu (Peka), Ha Lechesa, Ha Lepholisa, Ha Letsika, Ha Liteboho, Ha Mabote, Ha Mahlomola (Tabola), Ha Makoae (Liphakoeng), Ha Malebo, Ha Marana, Ha Masakale, Ha Mashape, Ha Mokhethi, Ha Mokhomo (Tabola), Ha Mokhoro, Ha Mokhosi (Fobane), Ha Monnanyane, Ha Monyane, Ha Mosae, Ha Mosamo, Ha Motako, Ha Motlau, Ha Mpeke, Ha Mpetsana (Fobane), Ha Napo, Ha Napo (Hlokoa-Lelle), Ha Nkokoane, Ha Ntahli, Ha Patsa, Ha Qhomane, Ha Ralebona, Ha Ralikariki, Ha Ramaboella, Ha Ramochana, Ha Ramohai, Ha Ramohapi, Ha Ramosalla, Ha Rantho, Ha Rantuba, Ha Seetsa, Ha Thipane, Ha Tjopa, Ha Tjopa (Peka), Ha Tšiea, Ha Tumo (Fobane), Masaleng (Peka), Molumong, Motimposo (Peka) and Nkanyane.

References

External links
 Google map of community villages

Populated places in Leribe District